Bassem al-Rubaye is an Iraqi independent politician who is the current Labour & Social Affairs Minister in the Government of Adil Abdul-Mahdi.

He was approved by the Council of Representatives on 24 October 2018.

References

Government ministers of Iraq
Living people
Year of birth missing (living people)
Place of birth missing (living people)
21st-century Iraqi politicians